Olesya Sergeyevna Pervushina (born 29 April 2000) is a Russian former tennis player.

She is noted for her serve and powerful groundstrokes. Pervushina has achieved a career-high junior ranking of No. 1, on 6 June 2016. In May 2016, she won the Trofeo Bonfiglio, a Grade-A tournament in Milan, Italy.

Pervushina won four singles titles and four doubles titles on the ITF Women's Circuit. On 17 April 2017, she reached her best singles ranking of world No. 348. On 12 June 2017, she peaked at No. 217 in the doubles rankings. Pervushina made her WTA Tour main-draw debut at the 2016 Pan Pacific Open, where she lost to Magda Linette in three sets.

ITF Circuit finals

Singles: 4 (4 titles)

Doubles: 6 (4 titles, 2 runner-ups)

Junior Grand Slam tournament finals

Doubles: 2 (2 runner-ups)

Awards
2016
 The Russian Cup in the nomination Girls Under-18 Team of the Year

References

External links
 
 

2000 births
Living people
Russian female tennis players
Tennis players from Moscow
Sportspeople from Khabarovsk
21st-century Russian women